Valentin Robu (born 17 January 1967) is a retired Romanian rower. He competed in coxed fours and eights at four Olympics and eight world championships, and won two Olympic silver medals in 1988 and 1992 and eight world championship medals, including gold medals in 1989 and 1994. After retiring from competitions he worked as a rowing coach. His wife Doina Robu and brother-in-law Ioan Snep are also retired Olympic rowers.

References

1967 births
Living people
Romanian male rowers
Rowers at the 1988 Summer Olympics
Rowers at the 1992 Summer Olympics
Rowers at the 1996 Summer Olympics
Rowers at the 2000 Summer Olympics
Olympic rowers of Romania
Olympic silver medalists for Romania
Olympic medalists in rowing
Medalists at the 1992 Summer Olympics
Medalists at the 1988 Summer Olympics

World Rowing Championships medalists for Romania
People from Săbăoani